Marise Widmer is a retired American lightweight rower. She won a gold medal at the 1984 World Rowing Championships in Montreal, Canada, with the lightweight women's eight; this was the only year that this boat class competed at World Rowing Championships. At the 1985 World Rowing Championships in Hazewinkel, she won a silver medal with the lightweight women's four.

References

Year of birth missing (living people)
Living people
American female rowers
World Rowing Championships medalists for the United States
21st-century American women